Kandeh (also Romanized as Kondeh; also known as Kianda and Kīyāndā) is a village in Dikleh Rural District, Hurand District, Ahar County, East Azerbaijan Province, Iran. At the 2006 census, its population was 297, in 61 families.

References 

Populated places in Ahar County